The Southern League was founded in 1929 as the inaugural season of speedway racing in the United Kingdom for Southern British teams. The league ran for 3 seasons before being amalgamated with the Northern League to form the National League. The first winners were Stamford Bridge Pensioners but it was Wembley Lions who won the most titles.

Champions

See also
List of United Kingdom Speedway League Champions

References

Speedway leagues
Speedway competitions in the United Kingdom
1929 in British motorsport
1930 in British motorsport
1931 in British motorsport
Southern England